The 2015 Indiana State Sycamores football team represented Indiana State University in the 2015 NCAA Division I FCS football season. They were led by third-year head coach Mike Sanford and played their home games at Memorial Stadium. They were a member of the Missouri Valley Football Conference. They finished the season 5–6, 3–5 in MVFC play to finish in a three way tie for sixth place.

Schedule

Source: Schedule

Game summaries

Butler

at Purdue

Southeast Missouri State

at Missouri State

at South Dakota State

Southern Illinois

North Dakota State

at Illinois State

at Northern Iowa

Western Illinois

Youngstown State

Ranking movements

References

Indiana State
Indiana State Sycamores football seasons
Indiana State Sycamores football